Taosi is an archaeological site in Xiangfen County, Shanxi, China. Taosi is considered to be part of the late phase of the Longshan culture in southern Shanxi, also known as the Taosi phase (2300 BC to 1900 BC).

Archaeology
Taosi was surrounded by a gigantic rammed-clay enclosure. This was discovered from 1999 to 2001 by the archaeologists from the Institute of Archaeology, Chinese Academy of Social Sciences; they attributed this wall to the Middle Taosi period (4,100 to 4,000 BP). Rectangular in form with an inner area of 280 ha.

An internal rammed-earth wall separated the residential and ceremonial areas of the elite from the areas inhabited by commoners, signifying the development of a stratified society.

A painted stick discovered from a prehistoric dating from 2300 BCE excavated at the astronomical site of Taosi is the oldest gnomon known in China. The gnomon was widely used in ancient China from the second century BC onward in order determine the changes in seasons, orientation, and geographical latitude. The ancient Chinese used shadow measurements for creating calendars that are mentioned in several ancient texts. According to the collection of Zhou Chinese poetic anthologies Classic of Poetry, one of the distant ancestors of King Wen of the Zhou dynasty used to measure gnomon shadow lengths to determine the orientation around the 14th-century BC.

The Huaxia settlement outgrew the perimeter of the wall. The settlement is the largest Longshan site discovered in the Linfen basin, Yellow River basin area, possibly a regional center. The settlement represents the most political system on the Central Plains at the time. The polites in the Taosi site are considered an advanced chiefdom, but may not have not developed into a higher political organization. It was not the Taosi pelites but, the less socially complex Central Plains Longshan sites, the scattered, multi-system competing systems that gave rise to early states in this region.

Ancient "observatory"
Taosi also contained an astronomical observatory, the oldest in East Asia.

This was discovered in 2003-2004. Archaeologists unearthed a Middle Taosi period semi-round foundation just beside southern wall of the Middle Taosi enclosure, which could be used for astronomical observations. The structure consists of an outer semi-ring-shaped path, and a semi-round rammed-earth platform with a diameter of about 60 m. The platform is 42m in diameter and over 1000 sq m in area, and can be reconstructed as a three-level altar.

On the top of the altar, an arch-shaped rammed earth foundation facing the east with 12 slots, each 0.15 to 0.2 m wide and 1.4 m between each other were discovered; standing in the center of the altar and watching through the slots, one can find that most of slots respectively orientate to a given point of the Chongfen Mountain to the east.

In a given period in the ancient times, the midwinter sunrise of the winter solstice would have been in the middle of the second eastern slot, the midsummer sunrise of the summer solstice would have been in the middle of the westmost slot, and during the seasons the sun would rise within each of the slots from west to east, marking the passage of time between the winter solstice and the summer solstice. This means these slots shares a similar function of the Thirteen Towers of the Chankillo Observatory, and they might have been intentionally constructed in for astronomical observation of the sunrise on a particular point in a given day, in order to establish the local solar calendar, which is crucial for the practice of agriculture at that time.

Necropolis
The cemetery of Taosi covered an area of 30,000 square meters (3ha) at its height.

The cemetery contained over 1,500 burials. The burials at Taosi were highly stratified (the most stratified of Longshan sites), with burial wealth concentrated in the graves of a few males (nine large graves). The largest graves were placed in separated rooms with murals, had a large cache of grave goods (some with over 200 objects, including jades, copper bells, wooden and crocodile skin musical instruments); middle-size graves featured painted wooden coffins and luxury objects; most of the small graves did not have grave goods. A single bronze bell was also found at a Taosi grave.

Emperor Yao connection
Several Chinese archaeologists postulate that Taosi was the site where the state of Youtang (有唐) being conquered by Emperor Yao, (traditionally c. 2356–2255 BC) who later instituted Taosi as the capital.

In Chinese classic documents Yao Dian (Document of Yao) in Shang Shu (Book of Ancient Time), and Wudibenji (Records for the Five Kings) in Shiji (Historic Records), King Yao assigned astronomic officers to observe celestial phenomena, including time  and position of sunrise, sunset, and stars in culmination, in order to systematically establish a solar calendar and a lunar calendar with 366 days a year with leap month. The observatory found at Taosi coincides with these records. It is theorized that the city collapsed with a rebellion against the ruling class.

On the other hand, some Western scholars assert that emperor Yao was a mythical figure.

Notes

References

 Chang, Kwang-chih. The Archaeology of Ancient China, 
 He, Nu and Wu, Jiabi.  Astronomical date of the "observatory" at Taosi site
 Higham, Charles, The Bronze Age of Southeast Asia, 
 Liu, Li. The Chinese Neolithic: Trajectories to Early States, 

Archaeological sites in China
Former populated places in China
Major National Historical and Cultural Sites in Shanxi
23rd-century BC establishments